Van Schooten's theorem, named after the Dutch mathematician Frans van Schooten, describes a property of equilateral triangles. It states:

For an equilateral triangle  with a point  on its circumcircle the length of longest of the three line segments  connecting  with the vertices of the triangle equals the sum of the lengths of the other two.

The theorem is a consequence of Ptolemy's theorem for concyclic quadrilaterals. Let  be the side length of the equilateral triangle  and  the longest line segment. The triangle's vertices together with  form a concyclic quadrilateral and hence Ptolemy's theorem yields:

Dividing the last equation by  delivers Van Schooten's theorem.

References 
Claudi Alsina, Roger B. Nelsen: Charming Proofs: A Journey Into Elegant Mathematics. MAA, 2010, pp. 102–103
Doug French: Teaching and Learning Geometry. Bloomsbury Publishing, 2004, pp. 62–64
Raymond Viglione: Proof Without Words: van Schooten′s Theorem. Mathematics Magazine, Vol. 89, No. 2 (April 2016), p. 132
Jozsef Sandor: On the Geometry of Equilateral Triangles. Forum Geometricorum, Volume 5 (2005), pp. 107–117

External links 

Van Schooten's theorem at cut-the-knot.org

Euclidean geometry
Theorems about triangles and circles
Theorems about equilateral triangles